Freud is an Austrian-German crime television series re-imagining the life of a young Sigmund Freud. The series produced 8 episodes which were first aired on ORF 15 March 2020 then released on Netflix on 23 March 2020.

Plot
The story tells of a fictional criminal case in Vienna in 1886, which marked the start of a major conspiracy.

Sigmund Freud (Robert Finster) is a 30-year-old neurologist fascinated by hypnotherapy, discovered during a recent study trip to France in the well-known clinic of Dr. Jean-Martin Charcot, a fervent advocate of the psychic nature of hysteria. Despite the support of his mentor Josef Breuer (Merab Ninidze), Freud's innovative theories are met with rejection by Theodor Meynert, the director of the psychiatric hospital where he works, and by his colleagues, including Leopold von Schönfeld, Meynert's protégé.

Sigmund is persuaded by his friend Arthur Schnitzler (Noah Saavedra) to participate in a party organised by Countess Sophia von Szápáry (Anja Kling) under the pretext of expanding the circle of influential acquaintances. During the party, the countess together with her husband, Viktor von Szápáry (Philipp Hochmair), will stage a séance revolving around the figure of the Hungarian medium Fleur Salomé (Ella Rumpf).

From that moment, Sigmund will find himself in the midst of murders, conspiracies, revenges and supernatural facts that he will have to solve by resorting to his new knowledge and the help of his housekeeper Leonore and war-traumatised police inspector Alfred Kiss (Georg Friedrich).

Episodes
The titles of the episodes quote Freud's works and concepts.

Cast

Main characters 

 : Sigmund Freud, 30-year-old Viennese Jew, disliked by the academic world for his ethnic origins and his scientific beliefs focused on hypnosis.
 Ella Rumpf: Fleur Salomé, Hungarian medium and foster daughter of Countess Sophia.
 Georg Friedrich: Alfred Kiss, former war veteran and Viennese police inspector.
 Brigitte Kren: Lenore, Freud's housekeeper and caretaker of the palace where he lives.
 : Franz Poschacher, Alfred Kiss's colleague and trusted friend.
 Anja Kling: Countess Sophia von Szápáry, vengeful woman of Hungarian origin, persecuted together with her family by the Austrian empire.
 Philipp Hochmair: Count Viktor von Szápáry, husband of Sophia von Szápáry and accomplice in her conspiracies.

Recurring characters 

 : Leopold von Schönfeld, protégé of prof. Meynert and Freud's opponent in the Vienna psychiatric hospital.
 : Henriette von Schönfeld, authoritarian and hysterical mother of Leopold and Clara.
 Zuzana Zvonícková: Clara von Schönfeld, little sister of Leopold.
 Rainer Bock: Prof. Dr. Theodor Meynert, director of the psychiatric hospital in Vienna.
 : Arthur Schnitzler, friend of Freud and doctor in the psychiatric hospital.
 Merab Ninidze: Dr. Josef Breuer, Freud's main supporter in the psychiatric hospital.
 Karel Hermánek Jr.: Otto Kiss, deceased son of Alfred Kiss.
 : Fanny Kiss, daughter-in-law of Alfred Kiss, widow of his son Otto.
 : Amalia Freud, Freud's mother.
 : Jacob Freud, Freud's father.
 : Anna Bernays (née Freud), Freud's younger sister.
 : Martha Bernays, Freud's fiancée.
 Nadiv Molcho: Eli Bernays, Freud's brother in law, husband of his sister Anna and brother of his fiancée Martha.
 : Georg von Lichtenberg, sworn enemy of Alfred Kiss since the war.
 : Feldmarschall Franz von Lichtenberg, father of Georg von Lichtenberg.
 : Oberleutnant Riedl, comrade in arms and lover of Georg von Lichtenberg.
 Stefan Konarske: Crown Prince Rudolf, heir to the Austrian throne.
 Johannes Krisch: Kaiser Franz Josef, Austrian Emperor.
 : Caspari, a hungarian nobleman.
 : Elise, a patient at the psychiatric hospital.
 : Herr Karl.
 : Oskar Janecek, Kiss' superior.
 : Anneli, a prostitute.
 : Heinz Konrad.
 Martin Weinek: Herr Lauritz.
 Manuel Ossenkopf: Frantisek Mucha, an opera singer.

Production
Filming took place in 2019, from January 8 to May 21, entirely in Prague, Czech Republic. The production consulted with Vienna-based psychoanalyst and hypnotherapist Juan José Rios.

Reception

Ratings
Over 400,000 viewers tuned in when the show premiered on the Austrian channel ORF in early March 2020.

Critical response
The first season of Freud holds a 50% rating at critical aggregator site Rotten Tomatoes. Writing for The Guardian, Adrian Horton likened Freud to "other absurd revisions of famous stories" like Abraham Lincoln: Vampire Hunter. The Daily Beast writer Nick Schager made the same comparison, writing that the series' "marrying truth with paranormal nonsense proves reasonably enlivening".

Awards and nominations
Freud has been nominated for two Romy Awards, in the categories of "Best TV Series" and "Best Production, TV Fiction".

Historical inaccuracies 

 The series implies that the mother of the Crown Prince Rudolf of Austria has long since died. On the contrary Elizabeth of Bavaria, the famous Sissi, died in 1898, therefore 9 years later than the death by suicide of her son Rudolf, which occurred in 1889.
 Sigmund Freud has indeed used cocaine until the age of forty. However, the devastating effects of the drug had not yet been discovered, as it had been only recently introduced in the medical field. Freud himself treated cocaine as a common medicine by providing prescriptions of it to friends and relatives. At first, Freud thought it could be used in ophthalmology, but later, after learning its side effects, he changed his mind and permanently gave up on it.
 Hypnosis was Freud's "first unconventional love", which earned him various criticisms from contemporaries, as reported by the series. Nevertheless, as in the case of cocaine, Freud will abandon hypnosis after a first enthusiastic approach, preferring other techniques of unconscious investigation that will form the foundations of psychoanalysis.
 The Austrian emperor Franz Joseph I was indeed attacked by Hungarian revolutionaries but in totally different conditions. On February 18, 1853, while walking with Count Maximilian Karl Lamoral O'Donnell, he was attacked by a Hungarian worker, János Libényi, who intended to avenge the Hungarian victims of the Hungarian Revolution of 1848.
 Prince Rudolf was really a great supporter of liberal politics and the so-called "Hungarian Renaissance", so much that he forced his father to have him stalked by the secret police for fear of betrayal. Similar to the character of the series, he had a troubled sentimental life full of sad episodes. After his arranged marriage to Princess Stéphanie of Belgium, he contracted gonorrhea, which made him sterile, and fell in love with 17-year-old Maria Vetsera. Tormented by depression, he took his own life together with his lover in 1889.
 The character of Fleur Salomé is based on a famous figure of the time, Lou von Salomé. Unlike Fleur, she was Russian and not Hungarian. Lou was in correspondence with Freud whom she particularly esteemed. She is also remembered for being the inspiring muse of Thus Spoke Zarathustra by Nietzsche, whose advances she refused. She also had a romantic relationship with the poet Rainer Maria Rilke and with the psychoanalyst Viktor Tausk.
 Josef Breuer was the first psychiatrist to treat hysteria with hypnosis. Thanks to Breuer, indeed, Freud became interested in hypnotherapy and the psychic nature of hysteria. Their joint studies and experiments will result in the first pre-psychoanalytic treatise in history, Studies on Hysteria.
 Unlike what the series tells, Freud met Arthur Schnitzler in person only in the early twenties of the twentieth century. Their relationship in previous years was exclusively epistolary. From their letters, it is clear that Arthur Schnitzler, although influenced by Freudian theories and esteemed by Freud himself, did not appreciate the psychoanalytic reading of his works, preferring instead a purely literary analysis. The two will never be able to develop a solid friendship and it seems that Freud had a certain unconscious fear towards Arthur, motivated by the fact that he perceived him as the "double" of him.

Moreover, many psychological terms and concepts that Freud uses in the series (set in 1886) has been introduced by him only later:

 The  and the affect trauma model were first presented by Freud in 1895 in his Studies on Hysteria.
 Still in 1895, in Project for a Scientific Psychology, he introduced for the first time the metaphor of consciousness as “light”, which gives only a limited insight into the interior, while the rest remains hidden in the “shadow”.
 The term "unconscious" (Unbewusste) first came up in 1897 in a letter to Wilhelm Fließ and was only publicly discussed in 1899 in the seventh chapter of The Interpretation of Dreams.
 He first spoke of "repression" (Verdrängung) in 1899 in his treatise on Interpretation of Dreams.
 The term "instinct/drive" (Trieb) was first mentioned in his Three Essays on the Theory of Sexuality in 1905 and was described in more details in 1915 in Instincts and their Vicissitudes.
 The concept of “Taboo” was first explored in 1912–1913 with Totem and Taboo.
 The notion of "Eros" was not introduced until 1920 that Beyond the Pleasure Principle.
 The role of fear was only understood in 1926 in Inhibitions, Symptoms and Anxiety.

See also
 Vienna Blood (TV series), a psychoanalyst solves murders

References

External links
 
 Freud at Rotten tomatoes
 Freud at Netflix
 Freud at Bavaria fiction
 Freud at ORF.at (in German)

Cultural depictions of Sigmund Freud
Television shows set in Vienna
Television shows filmed in the Czech Republic
2020s German drama television series
2020s Austrian television series